Steven Savoy (born February 27, 1982) is a former American football wide receiver in the Arena Football League who played for the Kansas City Command. He played college football for the Utah Utes. He also played in the Canadian Football League for the Hamilton Tiger-Cats.

References

1982 births
Living people
American football wide receivers
Canadian football wide receivers
Kansas City Command players
Hamilton Tiger-Cats players
Utah Utes football players